Gary DeWayne Lee (born February 12, 1965) is a former American football wide receiver for the Detroit Lions in the National Football League. He played collegiately for the Georgia Tech football team.

College Statistics
1983: 2 catches for 44 yards.
1984: 12 catches for 244 yards and 4 touchdowns. 2 carries for 6 yards.
1985: 29 catches for 645 yards and 6 touchdowns. 10 carries for 42 yards.
1986: 24 catches for 386 yards and 1 touchdown. 1 carry for -1 yard.

Detroit Lions
Gary Lee was selected in the 12th Round of the 1987 NFL Draft. Lee would serve as a backup wide receiver and kick returner for Detroit for just 2 seasons. In 1987, he had 19 catches for 308 yards and returned 32 kick offs for 719 yards. In 1988, he had 22 catches for 261 yards and 1 touchdown while returning 18 kick offs for 355 yards.

References

1965 births
Living people
Sportspeople from Albany, Georgia
American football wide receivers
American football return specialists
Georgia Tech Yellow Jackets football players
Detroit Lions players
Players of American football from Georgia (U.S. state)